The Amazing Race Canada 8 is the eighth season of The Amazing Race Canada, a reality game show based on the American series The Amazing Race. It features ten teams of two, each with a pre-existing relationship in a race across Canada and is hosted by Jon Montgomery. The grand prize includes a  cash payout, a "once-in-a-lifetime" trip for two around the world courtesy of GURU Organic Energy, and two Chevrolet Silverado ZR2s.

The season was scheduled to premiere in July 2020; however, after the COVID-19 pandemic forced production to postpone the season for two years due to travel restrictions between selected Canadian provinces, it premiered on July 5, 2022 with a preseason special etalk Presents: The Amazing Race Canada airing on July 1. The season finale aired on September 20, 2022.

Best friends and Broadway performers Catherine Wreford and Craig Ramsay were the winners of this season, becoming the second male/female team to win The Amazing Race Canada.

Production

Development and filming

The day after the finale of Season 7, CTV announced the renewal of the show for an eighth season.

After the COVID-19 pandemic led to CBS suspending production of the thirty-third season of American edition of The Amazing Race and Network 10 limiting the racecourse for the fifth season of The Amazing Race Australia to Australia, Mike Cosentino, the President of Content and Programming at Bell Media, stated in mid-March 2020 that "decisions around the upcoming eighth season will be made with the health and safety of the Racers and the crew as the top priority." As the COVID-19 pandemic in Canada worsened, Consentino stated two months later that pre-production for the upcoming season had been halted due to safety concerns. On June 23, 2020, the show announced on its social media that the season had been postponed until 2021. Insight Productions CEO John Brunton then stated in an interview on June 3, 2021 that the season would be delayed a second time to 2022 at the latest for safety reasons. Bell Media confirmed the second postponement at upfronts a week later with Justin Stockman, Bell Media's vice-president of content development and programming, announcing that the show would be a part of CTV's summer 2022 schedule.

On April 26, 2022, Ivanoh Demers of Radio-Canada reported that crew members were at La Grande Roue de Montréal. Teams were in Lethbridge, Alberta on April 30. On May 1, the show filmed in Fernie, British Columbia. Filming in Canmore, Alberta occurred on May 4. Racers were spotted in Kelowna and Vernon, British Columbia on May 6 & 7. Filming took place in Belleville and Picton, Ontario on May 12. A task at the Richmond Night Market occurred on May 21, the date when filming officially wrapped.

For the first time in the series, host Jon Montgomery doesn't introduce the teams; instead, the teams introduce themselves.

By happenstance, retired National Hockey League player Ron Sutter helped siblings Jesse Cockney and Marika Sila with directions during Leg 2 in Lethbridge, Alberta.

2022 Winter Paralympics gold medalist Mark Arendz appeared as the Pit Stop greeter during the fourth leg in Canmore, Alberta.

This season introduced two new obstacles: the On Ramp and the Pass. The On Ramp was a task that allowed teams to find an On Ramp Pass and return to The Amazing Race Canada. The Pass was an obstacle that is similar to the Yield. The team that received the Pass would have to wait for another team to arrive and pass them before continuing on. Also, for the first time in Amazing Race Canada history, four teams competed in the final leg. Similar to the sixth Vietnamese season, all four remaining teams in this season crossed the Finish Line.

Casting
Casting for the season initially began on October 10, 2019 with a deadline of December 1. On January 8, 2020, the first stage of casting for this season was completed. Due to the COVID-19 pandemic in Canada, contestants were required to be fully vaccinated.

Marketing
Chevrolet and Expedia returned as sponsors. New sponsors included Desjardins Group, Subway Canada, Destination BC, GURU Organic Energy, Marshalls, Tourism Richmond, Trans Canada Trail, Disney+, which promoted Pinocchio and Andor, and Marvel Studios, which promoted Thor: Love and Thunder and She-Hulk: Attorney at Law.

Cast
The cast includes Big Brother Canada 9 winner Tychon Carter-Newman, Broadway theatre actress Catherine Wreford, Inuvialuit Olympic cross-country skier Jesse Cockney, actress and Inuvialuit activist Marika Sila, and singer and Juno Award-winning artist Jully Black.

Results
The following teams participated in this season, each listed along with their placements in each leg and relationships as identified by the program. Note that this table is not necessarily reflective of all content broadcast on television, owing to the inclusion or exclusion of some data. Placements are listed in finishing order.

A  placement with a dagger indicates that the team was eliminated. 
An italicized and underlined placement indicates that the team was the last to arrive, but there was no rest period at the pit stop and all teams were instructed to continue racing. There was no required Speed Bump task in the next leg.
An  placement with a double-dagger indicates that the team was the last to arrive at a pit stop in a non-elimination leg, and had to perform a Speed Bump task in the following leg.
A  indicates that a team was temporarily removed from the competition due to COVID-19.
An  indicates that the team used an Express Pass on that leg to bypass one of their tasks.
A  indicates that the team chose the Pass and a  indicates the team who received it.
A  indicates that a team was returned to the competition after finding an On Ramp Pass.
A  next to a leg number indicates that there was a Face Off on that leg and a  indicates the team that lost the Face Off.

Notes

Prizes
The prize for each leg is awarded to the first place team for that leg.
Leg 1 – A trip for two to Los Angeles, California, which included tickets to the Hollywood premiere of Thor: Love and Thunder, a $2,500 Marshalls gift card, and three Express Passes.
Leg 2 – A trip for two to Lima, Peru, a $5,000 Marshalls gift card, and a $5,000 Subway gift card for sandwiches for a year.
Leg 3 – A trip for two to Bangkok, Thailand, and a $2,000 Marshalls gift card.
 Leg 4 – A trip for two to Buenos Aires, Argentina, and a $1,500 Marshalls gift card.
 Leg 5 – A trip for two to London, England, and a $2,000 Marshalls gift card.
 Leg 6 – A trip for two to Honolulu, Hawaii, and a $1,500 Marshalls gift card.
 Leg 7 – A trip for two to Geneva, Switzerland, and a $2,500 Marshalls gift card.
 Leg 8 – A trip for two to Istanbul, Turkey, and a $2,000 Marshalls gift card.
 Leg 9 – A trip for two to Mexico City, Mexico, 250,000 Expedia rewards points each, valued at $2,500, and a $2,500 Marshalls gift card.
 Leg 10 – A trip for two to Auckland, New Zealand, and a $3,500 Marshalls gift card.
Leg 11 – A  cash payout, a "once-in-a-lifetime" trip for two around the world courtesy of GURU Organic Energy, and a 2022 Chevrolet Silverado ZR2 for each team member.

 The Express Pass is an item that can be used to skip any one task of the team's choosing before the end of the seventh leg. The team that won Leg 1 keeps one but must give the two others to other teams before the end of the fourth leg.

Race summary

Leg 1 (Quebec)

Airdate: July 5, 2022
Mont-Tremblant, Quebec, Canada (Mont Tremblant Resort – Place St-Bernard) (Starting Line)
 Mont-Tremblant (Village Dock) to Montreal (Old Montreal)
 Montreal (La Grande Roue de Montréal)
 Montreal (Upstairs Jazz or The Wiggle Room)
Montreal (Rialto Theatre) 

In this season's first Roadblock, one team member had to climb  to the top of La Grande Roue de Montréal and retrieve their next clue and pieces of Mjölnir. Only two racers could perform this task at a time.

This season's first Detour was a choice between Jazz and Pizzazz. In Jazz, teams had to learn and perform a song by Juno Award winner Ranee Lee, which had to include improvised scat singing, to receive their next clue and pieces of Mjölnir. In Pizzazz, teams had to learn and perform a burlesque routine, which included removing articles of their costumes in the correct order, to receive their next clue and pieces of Mjölnir from Frenchy Jones.

Additional tasks
At Mont Tremblant Resort, teams had to search for five marked plaques and decode a book cipher, where the first number of the code represented a numbered plaque and the second number represented the position of a letter on the plaque. After unscrambling the letters to spell Old Montreal, teams would receive their next clue.
In Old Montreal, teams had to find one of two people wearing flat-panel display digital posters for Thor: Love and Thunder to receive their next clue and pieces of Mjölnir.
At the Rialto Theatre, teams had to assemble the pieces of Mjölnir they received during the leg before checking into the Pit Stop.

Additional note
At the Mont-Tremblant Village Dock, teams had to sign up for one of two buses, each of which would carry five teams and would depart 15 minutes apart, to Old Montreal and could pick up GURU energy drinks.

Leg 2 (Quebec → Alberta)

Airdate: July 12, 2022

 Montreal (Montréal–Trudeau International Airport) to Calgary, Alberta (Calgary International Airport)
Lethbridge (Indian Battle Park – Rattlesnake Statue)
 Lethbridge (Helen Schuler Nature Centre or Fort Whoop-Up)
Lethbridge (Subway)
 Lethbridge (Ctrl V Virtual Reality Arcade)
Waterton Lakes National Park (Prince of Wales Hotel) 

This leg's Detour was a choice between Hoot or Herd. In Hoot, one team member had to memorize seven owl sounds and the other team member had to memorize descriptions of the sounds. When teams could match the sounds to the descriptions, they would receive their next clue from staffer Dallas. In Herd, teams had to choose a coloured bandana, find nine goats wearing that bandana colour, and correctly add the numbers on the bandanas from memory to receive their next clue from staffer Mel.

In this leg's Roadblock, one team member had to don a virtual reality headset, play a game of Rhythmatic, and score at least 90% successful slices to receive their next clue from arcade owner Lance.

Additional tasks
At Indian Battle Park, teams would watch a Siksika dance before receiving a golden eagle feather and their next clue.
At Subway, teams had to memorize a list of vegetables (22 tomatoes, 15 bell peppers, 18 onions, and 27 cucumbers), collect the vegetables from three farm stands outside the city, and deliver them to the restaurant to receive their next clue and Subway sandwiches from Downsview Subway manager Lisa Crocker.

Additional note
At Calgary International Airport, teams would find a marked 2022 Chevrolet Blazer RS, which would serve as their transportation while in Alberta, with their next clue.

Leg 3 (Alberta → British Columbia)

Airdate: July 19, 2022
 Waterton Park (Pat's Waterton to Wieners of Waterton)
 Pincher Station (Grain Elevator) to Sparwood, British Columbia (Terex Titan)
 Fernie (Kootenay Fly Shop & Guiding Co. and Elk River or GearHub Sports)
 Fernie (2nd Avenue)
Fernie (Fernie Golf Course – 4th Hole) 

This leg's Detour was a choice between Learning to Fly or Ready to Roll. In Learning to Fly, teams had to listen to a fishing story from store owner Scott that incorporates quirky names for fly fishing lures, run  to the Elk River, and arrange a set of 20 fishing lures in the order that they were mentioned in the story to receive their next clue from fishing guide Josh. In Ready to Roll, teams had to assemble a mountain bicycle so that it matched an example to receive their next clue from store owner Mark.

In this leg's Roadblock, one team member had to don a leotard and leg warmers to then learn and perform a 1980s-style aerobics routine for Fernie denizens to the satisfaction of instructor Marlene Vale to receive their next clue.

Additional task
At Pat's Waterton, teams had to pedal a Surrey bike to Wieners of Waterton, choose a list of four food orders, and deliver the food by bike to the listed addresses from memory to receive their next clue from owner Max Low.

Additional notes
At Pincher Station's grain elevator, teams had to sign up for one of two busesthe first would carry four teams and the second five teams departing 15 minutes apartto Sparwood and could pick up GURU energy drinks. Teams would then use the Expedia mobile app to book their overnight accommodation in nearby Pincher Creek.
In Sparwood, teams would find a marked 2022 Chevrolet Traverse LT, which would serve as their transportation to Fernie, with their next clue.

Leg 4 (British Columbia → Alberta)

Airdate: July 26, 2022

 Fernie (Fernie City Hall) to Kananaskis Country (Canoe Meadows) 
 Kananaskis Country (Kananaskis River)
 Kananaskis Country (Star 6 Ranch – Red Barn)
Canmore (Trans Canada Trail – Bow River)
 Canmore (Canmore Nordic Centre)
Canmore (Canmore Nordic Centre – Biathlon Range) 

As a result of re-entering The Amazing Race Canada, Jully & Kathy and Cassie & Jahmeek had to complete a Speed Bump that involved inflating a whitewater canoe before they could continue racing.

In this leg's first Roadblock, one team member had to secure a pack onto a simulated horse by tying a diamond hitch to receive their next clue from ranch owner Fiona Mactaggart.

In this leg's second Roadblock, the team member who did not perform the previous Roadblock had to complete an all-terrain slalom course within 105 seconds on an adaptive eBike to receive their next clue from the bike's inventor Christian Bagg.

Additional tasks
From Canoe Meadows, teams paddled whitewater canoes  down the Kananaskis River to their next clue.
At the Trans Canada Trail, teams had to complete a sliding puzzle of a section of the trail to receive their next clue from local artist Stephanie Von Neudegg.

Additional notes
At Fernie City Hall, teams had to sign up for one of two busesthe first would carry three teams and the second four teams departing 15 minutes apart starting at 7:30 p.m. and could pick up GURU energy drinks.
After the first Roadblock, teams had to choose a 2022 Chevrolet Traverse RS, which would serve as their transportation for the rest of the leg.

Leg 5 (Alberta → British Columbia)

Airdate: August 9, 2022

 Calgary (Calgary International Airport) to Kelowna, British Columbia (Kelowna International Airport)
 Lumby (Freedom Flight School) (Overnight Rest)
 Silver Star Provincial Park (Sovereign Lake Nordic Centre) 
 Vernon (Vernon Lawn Bowling Club or Davison Orchards)
Lake Country (Jealous Fruits Orchard)
Vernon (Predator Ridge Resort – Yoga Platform) 

In this leg's first Roadblock, one team member had perform a tandem paraglide above the Okanagan to receive their next clue from their instructor. Teams had to first find a sign-up board to determine the order in which they would paraglide and could pick up GURU energy drinks.

In this leg's second Roadblock, the team member who did not perform the previous Roadblock had to complete a biathlon by cross-country skiing around a  loop to a firing range and shoot five targets with five rounds to receive their next clue from manager Troy Hudson. If racers missed any targets, they had to ski the loop again before attempting to shoot the remaining targets.

For their Speed Bump, Cassie & Jahmeek had to sort a pile of ski boots onto shelves by size and style before Cassie could attempt the second Roadblock.

This leg's Detour was a choice between Ball'n or Pomme'n. In Ball'n, teams had to score five points in a game of lawn bowling by rolling biased bowls closer to a jack than a pair of local competitors to receive their next clue from groundskeeper Moe Ball. In Pomme'n, teams had to make five miniature apple pies by rolling out dough, slicing apples, and adding a pastry lattice top to the satisfaction of Rachel Davidson to receive their next clue.

Additional task
At Jealous Fruits Orchard, teams had to count the cherry trees within a marked area (548) then calculate the weight of cherries that the trees would yield to receive their next clue.

Additional note
At Kelowna International Airport, teams would find a marked 2022 Chevrolet Trailblazer RS, which would serve as their transportation for this leg, with their next clue.

Leg 6 (British Columbia → Ontario)

Airdate: August 16, 2022

 Kelowna (Kelowna International Airport) to Toronto, Ontario (Toronto Pearson International Airport)
 Mississauga (Toronto Pearson Terminal 1 Station) to Toronto (Union Station)
 (TTC Subway) Toronto (Union Station to Dundas Station)
Toronto (Marshalls − Yonge & Gerrard Streets)
 Toronto (Union Station) to London (London Station)
London (East Park Golf Gardens – 10th Fairway) 
 London (Fanshawe College – Norton Wolf School of Aviation and Aerospace Technology or School of Digital and Performing Arts)
 London (Middlesex Agility Club)
London (Western University – Western Interdisciplinary Research Building)
London (Western University – Western Alumni Stadium) 

This leg's Detour was a choice between Aviate or Animate. In Aviate, teams had to attach a propeller to a Cessna 150 to receive their next clue from professor Jamie. In Animate, one team member had to don a motion capture suit and recreate the movements of an animated movie starring Jon Montgomery, without watching the movie, to receive their next clue from professor Rob, while their partner took on the role of director. Once teams began an attempt, the director could not instruct their partner. Jesse & Marika used their Express Pass given by Brendan & Connor to bypass the "Animate" task.

In this leg's Roadblock, one team member had to lead a dog through a dog agility course within 45 seconds to receive their next clue.

Additional tasks
At Marshalls, teams had to memorize a photograph of an outfit and search the aisles for four matching items, which had to cost less than $200, to receive their next clue from a Marshalls associate.
At the Western Interdisciplinary Research Building, teams had to don a Muse headband and meditate until they heard 30 birds chirps from the headband's app to receive their next clue from Professor John Paul Minda.

Additional note
At East Park Golf Gardens, teams found Jon Montgomery, who informed them that two out of three teams who were unable to continue due to COVID-19 would be re-entering the competition after solving a riddle and finding an On Ramp Pass in a well. The team who could not find a pass was eliminated.

Leg 7 (Ontario)

Airdate: August 23, 2022
 London (Springbank Park) to Toronto (Downtown Toronto) (Overnight Rest) 
 Toronto (Union Station) to Belleville (Belleville Station)
 Macaulay Mountain Conservation Area, Prince Edward County (Birdhouse City)
Picton (Prince Eddy's Brewing Company) 
 Picton (Spark Box Studio or Savon Du Bois)
Belleville (Sir James Whitney School for the Deaf)
Sandbanks Provincial Park (Beach) 

In this leg's Roadblock, one team member had to choose an abstract map and fill in the names of fourteen birdhouses to receive their next clue from Quinte Conservation Chief Administrative Officer Brad McNevin.

This leg's Detour was a choice between Press It or Push It. In Press It, teams had to replicate a message by arranging type pieces in reverse and then printing out the message on a printing press to receive their next clue. In Push It, one team member had to sit in a tub and relay instructions to their partner to make 15 working bath bombs and receive their next clue.

Additional tasks
In the streets of Downtown Toronto, teams had to search for one of two people wearing red hats with tickets for a train to Belleville, Ontario leaving at either 6:17 a.m. or 6:32 a.m. and carrying three and five teams respectively.
At Sir James Whitney School for the Deaf, one team member would be taught how to sign the name of the school's first deaf professor, while their partner would memorize the American manual alphabet. Once the latter team member was able to identify the name Samuel Greene, teams would receive their next clue. Franca & Nella used their Express Pass given by Brendan & Connor to bypass this task. While Brendan & Connor themselves also used their Express Pass to bypass the same task.

Additional note
At Springbank Park, teams had to sign up for one of two buses, each of which would carry four teams and would depart 15 minutes apart, to Toronto and could pick up GURU energy drinks.

Leg 8 (Ontario & Quebec)

Airdate: August 30, 2022

 Belleville (Belleville Station) to Ottawa (Ottawa Station)
Gatineau, Quebec (Canadian Museum of History) (Overnight Rest)
 Ottawa, Ontario (Canada Aviation and Space Museum)
  Ottawa (Cumberland Ferry Terminal) to Gatineau, Quebec (Masson-Angers Ferry Terminal)
 Montebello (Fairmont Le Château Montebello)
Montebello (Le Petit Château B&B)
Montebello (Manoir Papineau) 

In this leg's Roadblock, teams had to search the Canadian Museum of History for the de Havilland Canada DHC-2 Beaver and retrieve a ticket for a flight on a vintage biplane, where one team member had to spot a  letter M to receive their next clue from the pilot.

For this season's first Face Off, two teams had to compete against each other in a game of croquet. The first team to clear two balls through a series of wickets and hit the centre peg would receive their next clue, while the losing team had to wait for another team. The last team remaining at the Face Off had to turn over an hourglass and wait out a 15-minute time penalty before moving on.

Additional tasks
At the Canadian Museum of History, teams had to search through a collection of 3,000 stamps to find the postage cost of 13 stamps provided to them to receive their next clue.
In Montebello, teams had to search for six witnesses, who would give their statements in Québécois French, to solve a murder mystery and receive their next clue from the inspector.

Additional notes
Once in Ottawa, teams had to find a marked 2022 Chevrolet Bolt EUV, which would serve as their transportation for this leg, with their next clue.
After arriving at the Canadian Museum of History, teams had to use the Expedia mobile app to book their admission tickets.
Following the Roadblock, teams had to travel by ferry across the Ottawa River and use their car's in-built GPS to navigate to their next destination.

Leg 9 (Quebec → Ontario → New Brunswick)

Airdate: September 6, 2022

 Ottawa, Ontario (Ottawa Macdonald–Cartier International Airport) to Bathurst, Acadian Peninsula, New Brunswick (Bathurst Airport)
Bathurst (Frostbites Dairy Bar)
 Caraquet (La Brôkerie)
Bertrand (Village Historique Acadien) 
 Haut-Shippagan (Cielo)
Pokeshaw (Pokeshaw Rock) 

In this leg's Roadblock, one team member had to perform an Acadian stepdance to receive their next clue from Rebecca.

For their Speed Bump, Brendan & Connor had to use traditional couvreur tools to make 50 roof shingles before they could continue racing.

This season's final Detour was choice between Oyster Shuck or Clean & Tuck. In Oyster Shuck, teams had to delicately shuck open 24 oysters and then replicate two oyster platers to receive their next clue from co-owner Pat. In Clean & Tuck, teams had to clean a glamping dome so that it matched an example to receive their next clue from co-owner Emilie.

Additional tasks
At Frostbites Dairy Bar, teams received ice cream cones and their next clue, which instructed them to load their Silverado with two pieces of plywood, a lobster trap, and two chairs, which they would need during the leg, to receive their next clue.
At Village Historique Acadien, teams had to dress in 17th century clothing and wooden clogs and fill a water barrel using a yoke and two small buckets to receive their next clue.

Additional note
Once in Bathurst, teams had to find a marked 2022 Chevrolet Silverado ZR2, which would serve as their transportation for this leg.

Leg 10 (New Brunswick → Ontario)

Airdate: September 13, 2022
 Bathurst (Bathurst Airport) to Toronto, Ontario (Toronto Pearson International Airport)
Bowmanville (Canadian Tire Motorsport Park) 
 (Floatplane) Oshawa (Oshawa Executive Airport) to Tobermory, Bruce Peninsula (Georgian Bay)
Tobermory (Divers Den)
 Wiarton (Lloyd's Smoke Shop & Pool Hall)
Meaford (CFB Meaford)
Georgian Bluffs (The Inn at Cobble Beach – Lighthouse) 

In this leg's Roadblock, one team member had to drive a 2022 Chevrolet Corvette Stingray through a  precision driving course within 150 seconds to receive their next clue from a Driving Experience instructor.

For this season's final Face Off, two teams had to compete against each other in a game of snooker. The team who scored more points would receive their next clue, while the losing team had to wait for another team. The last team remaining at the Face Off had to turn over an hourglass and wait out a 15-minute time penalty before moving on.

Additional tasks
At Divers Den, one team member had to follow a series of buoys to swim to four shipwreck known as the Tugs, find four numbers with their chosen colour, and relay the numbers to their partner, who had to use them to unlock a treasure chest containing keys to a 2022 Chevrolet Equinox RS that had their next clue.
At CFB Meaford, teams had to run through an obstacle course while a training officer would list the 4th Canadian Division's seven critical military values, which they had to repeat in order to Major Wheeler to receive their next clue.

Additional note
After the Roadblock, teams had to use the OnStar mobile app to navigate to Oshawa Executive Airport, where they would sign up for one of three floatplanes, the first of which carried one team and the other two carried two teams each, that departed ten minutes apart to Tobermory and could pick up GURU energy drinks.

Leg 11 (Ontario → British Columbia)

Airdate: September 20, 2022
 Toronto (Toronto Pearson International Airport) to Vancouver, British Columbia (Vancouver International Airport)
Vancouver (Cardero Park)
  Vancouver (Vancouver Harbour Heliport) to West Vancouver (Caulfeild Cove)
 North Vancouver (Wallace Shipyards)
Vancouver (UBC Old Auditorium)
Richmond (Richmond Night Market)
Vancouver (Vancouver Public Library Central Branch)
Vancouver (BC Place) 

In this leg's first Roadblock, one team member had to don a wetsuit, jump  from a Eurocopter AS365 Dauphin, and swim to a buoy with their next clue.

In this season's final Roadblock, the team member who did not perform the previous Roadblock had to don old school roller skates and complete an obstacle course within 75 seconds to receive their next clue.

Additional tasks
At UBC Old Auditorium, teams had to learn and sing the Italian lyrics to the song "Libiamo ne' lieti calici" from Verdi's opera La traviata to receive their next clue from Nancy.
At Richmond Night Market, teams had to purchase ten food orders from ten different vendors to receive their next clue.
At Vancouver Public Library Central Branch, teams had to place 27 riddles describing challenges that they completed on the nine previous legs that all teams raced beneath the location where the tasks occurred and in chronological order to receive their final clue.

Episode title quotes
Episode titles are often taken from quotes made by the racers.
"Come on Doodlebug" – Brendan
"Goatageddon" – Court
"We Love Weenies!" – Brendan
"Feel the Fear and Do It Anyways" – Jully
"I'm a Human Kite" – Kathy
"Racing for Our Lives" – Ali
"What the Duck Is Going On?" – Court
"Give Me a Moustache and Call Me Sherlock Holmes" – Nella
"I Love You. I Know." – Court & Ali
"Is that a Wild Peacock?" – Brendan
"Where Is Gurmail?" – Nella

Ratings

No episode aired on August 2 following Civic Holiday; CTV instead aired a rebroadcast of The 4th Annual Howie Mandel Stand-Up Extravaganza.
No ratings data was provided by Numeris following August 28, 2022.

References

External links

 08
2022 Canadian television seasons
Television productions postponed due to the COVID-19 pandemic
Television series impacted by the COVID-19 pandemic
Television shows filmed in Quebec
Television shows filmed in Alberta
Television shows filmed in British Columbia
Television shows filmed in Ontario
Television shows filmed in New Brunswick